Elyse Myers is an American social media influencer and comedian. Her platforms are TikTok and Instagram. She gained notability with her account of her worst date during which she purchased 100 tacos.

Career
Myers's October 2021 recounting of her worst date went viral on TikTok. In it, a man tricks her into buying 100 tacos, and "Let's Feast" became a memorable phrase from the experience. The video took off almost immediately, and the sudden fame startled her.

In 2022, Myers launched the podcast Funny Cuz It's True with Lemonada Media and Powderkeg Media.

Philosophical views
Myers seeks to "promote mental well-being and compassion." She is open about being introverted, her ADHD and anxiety, and her experiences stemming from those. Myers is candid in her videos and promotes body positivity. She supports the Humane Society and organizations for foster children.

Personal life
Myers lives in Nebraska with her husband and son. As of January, 2023 she is pregnant with their second child.

References

External links
 

American TikTokers
Living people
Instagram accounts
Web designers
American women comedians
21st-century American comedians
Comedians from Nebraska
1993 births